W16CW-D, virtual channel 54, UHF digital channel 16, is a low-powered television station serving southern Puerto Rico that is licensed to Villalba. The station is owned by TV Red Puerto Rico. The station's transmitter is located at Cerro Maravilla in Ponce.

Digital channels

The station's digital signal is multiplexed:

External links

16CW-D
Low-power television stations in the United States